Clássica da Arrábida is a one-day road cycling race held in Portugal annually since 2017. It is part of UCI Europe Tour in category 1.2.

Winners

References

Cycle races in Portugal
UCI Europe Tour races
Recurring sporting events established in 2017